Michael R. Montler (January 11, 1944 – December 13, 2018) was an American football guard, center and offensive tackle who played ten seasons in the American Football League and in the National Football League for the Boston/New England Patriots, Buffalo Bills, Denver Broncos, and the Detroit Lions.

University of Colorado
Montler played college football at the University of Colorado where he was All-American in 1968.

Buffalo Bills
In 1973, his fifth year in the NFL, he became the starting center of the Bills, replacing Remi Prudhomme, splitting time with Bruce Jarvis, centering between Reggie McKenzie at left guard and Hall-of-Famer Joe DeLamielleure at right guard, for a fine 9-5 team, when O.J. Simpson became the first running back to rush for over 2,000 yards. In 1974, Montler won the job away from Jarvis, starting in all 14 games for another 9-5 season. The Bills lost ground in 1975 with a won-lost record of 8-6, despite having the best offense in the entire NFL with 420 points (30.0 points/game). For the second year in a row, Montler played all 14 games between McKenzie and DeLamielleure in the stout middle of the Bills offensive line. Although the same trio played together in all 14 games in 1976, the team sagged to 2-12, an offense worth 20th place in scoring and a defense 24th in points allowed. Montler was replaced by 5-year pro Willie Parker.

Denver Broncos and Detroit Lions
Montler became the starting center for the Denver Broncos in 1977 for all 14 games and the Detroit Lions  in 1978, but only in 4 games.

Death
Montler died on December 13, 2018, aged 74 in Grand Junction, Colorado.

References

1944 births
2018 deaths
American football centers
Boston Patriots players
Buffalo Bills players
Colorado Buffaloes football players
Denver Broncos players
Detroit Lions players
New England Patriots players
Players of American football from Columbus, Ohio
American Football League players